Mogh Ahmad-e Pain (also Romanized as Mogh Aḩmad-e Pā'īn; also known as Mogh Aḩmad and Mugh Ahmad) is a village in Gachin Rural District, in the Central District of Bandar Abbas County, Hormozgan Province, Iran. At the 2006 census, its population was 440, in 92 families.

References 

Populated places in Bandar Abbas County